Routrapur is a village of the  42 Mouza island situated on the banks of Kathajodi river  of Cuttack Sadar Tehsil, Cuttack district, Odisha under Cuttack Sadar Block, Near about  from Cuttack Town. It is known as the birthplace of legend Odia singer Sikandar Alam formerly known as Salabega of Modern Odisha.

According to Census 2011 information the location code or village code of Rautrapur village is 400074. It is situated 10 km away from sub-district headquarter Cuttack Sadar and 15 km away from district headquarter Cuttack. Kalapada is the Gram Panchayat of Rautrapur village.
Ration card of routrapur

References

Villages in Cuttack district